Rebecca Jones may refer to: 

Rebecca Jones (Mexican actress) (born 1957)
Rebecca Jones (archaeologist), Scottish archaeologist
Rebecca Jones (astronomer) (died 1966), American astronomer and discoverer of the Jones-Emberson 1 nebula
Rebecca Naomi Jones (born 1981), American actress and singer
Rebecca Field Jones, American artist

See also
Rebekah Jones, American data scientist and former official of the Florida Department of Health